BBM ("Baker Bruce Moore") is the name of the short-lived power trio, formed in 1993 by long-established artists, bassist Jack Bruce, guitarist Gary Moore (both of whom had collaborated previously on Moore's Corridors of Power) and drummer Ginger Baker (who, with Bruce, was part of Cream - considered one of the first power trios). They released just one studio album, entitled Around the Next Dream, which was released on the Virgin record label. It reached Number 9 in the UK Albums Chart in the summer of 1994, but spent only four weeks in the listings. The track, "Where in the World" was issued as a single, reaching Number 57 in the UK Singles Chart in August 1994. Much of the work was written by Moore with contributions by Bruce, Baker and percussionist Kip Hanrahan. The album cover featured a photograph of Baker portraying an angel smoking a cigarette.

The band went on a short UK tour to coincide with the album's release and also played a handful of rock festivals on the continent, before disbanding.

Around the Next Dream

Track listing

Personnel 
BBM
 Ginger Baker – drums (on all tracks except "Where In The World"), percussion, production
 Jack Bruce – bass, cello, vocals, keyboards (on "Wrong Side Of Town"), production
 Gary Moore – guitar, vocals, production

Additional personnel
 Tommy Eyre – keyboards (on all tracks except "Wrong Side Of Town")
 Morris Murphy – trumpet (on "Glory Days")
 Arran Ahmun – drums (on "Where In The World")

Technical personnel
 Ian Taylor – engineer, production
 David Scheinmann - photography

Charts

References

Rock music supergroups
British rock music groups
Musical groups established in 1993
1993 establishments in Virginia
British musical trios